Sir Humphrey Francis O'Leary  (12 February 1886 – 16 October 1953) was the seventh Chief Justice of New Zealand, from 1946 to 1953.

Early life and family
Born in Redwoodtown in the Wairau Valley, Marlborough, in 1886, his father, an Irish immigrant, was a blacksmith who had migrated to Masterton. When his father heard that one of his sons was not doing well at the local Catholic school, he sent his son to Masterton Public. From that time, although he remained faithful to the Catholic religion, Humphrey O'Leary attended state schools. He gained a Wellington Education Board scholarship and Queen's Scholarship in 1899, which enabled him to attend  Wellington College. There his academic ability, outgoing personality and sporting prowess made him a popular student. The Queen's Scholarship also paid for three years at university and he enrolled in 1902 to study law at Victoria College.

In 1912, O'Leary married Lillian Gallagher, and the couple went on to have one son.

Legal career
O'Leary was awarded an LLB degree in 1908, and from 1908 to 1909 he was a New Zealand University rugby representative. He first worked for Wilford and Levi, a law firm, then went into partnership with a university friend Frank Kelly as O'Leary and Kelly. In 1919 he was invited to join the Wellington legal firm that would become known as Bell Gully. He was appointed a King's Counsel on 30 May 1935.

O'Leary was president of the Wellington Law Society from 1921 to 1922, and the New Zealand Law Society between 1935 and 1946. He also served on the Victoria University College Council and the University of New Zealand Senate. He was the Chief Justice of New Zealand from 1946 until his death in Auckland in 1953, aged 67.

Honours
O'Leary was made a King's Counsel in 1935, a Knight Commander of the Order of St Michael and St George in the 1947 New Year Honours, and Honourable Master of the Bench of the Inner Temple, London in 1948.

See also
 List of King's and Queen's Counsel in New Zealand

Notes

References
 The Story of Bell Gully Buddle Weir by Julia Millen (1990, Bell Gully) 

1886 births
1953 deaths
Chief justices of New Zealand
New Zealand Roman Catholics
People educated at Wellington College (New Zealand)
High Court of New Zealand judges
Members of the Judicial Committee of the Privy Council
20th-century New Zealand judges
New Zealand people of Irish descent
People from Auckland
People from Blenheim, New Zealand
Victoria University of Wellington alumni
New Zealand King's Counsel
New Zealand Knights Commander of the Order of St Michael and St George
New Zealand members of the Privy Council of the United Kingdom